Digital Group Audio (DGA) is a privately held consumer electronics company based in Carlsbad, California.

History 

Founded in 2007 by Erik Groset and Robin DeFay, DGA began as an electronic hardware start-up focusing on portable audio solutions.

President Erik Groset, 25, has been recognized by Young Inventors International as a success story as well as being named to the list of San Diego's 2010 Young Influentials.  Erik comes from a lineage of inventors including his great-grandfather, John P. Groset, who is credited with inventing the ice cream cone making machine.

Vice President Robin DeFay, 26, spent five years as a professional poker player  before joining the venture.  Robin attended California State University, San Marcos.

Awards and recognition
Businessweek: One of America's Most Promising Start-Ups
2008 WIRED Small Biz Contest (Nomination).

Products 
LiveSpeakr – Portable Speaker System

Trade Shows and Event Appearances 
2010 Consumer Electronics Show
2010 MacWorld Conference & Expo

References 

Audio equipment manufacturers of the United States
Companies based in Carlsbad, California